Kirlampudi Layout is a neighbourhood of the city of Visakhapatnam, state of Andhra Pradesh, India.

About
It is one of the important neighbourhoods in Visakhapatnam and is one of the more affluent areas in the city.

Transport
It is well connected with Gajuwaka, NAD X Road, Malkapuram, Dwaraka Nagar and Visakhapatnam Steel Plant.

APSRTC routes

References

Neighbourhoods in Visakhapatnam